USS LST-391 was an  built for the United States Navy during World War II. 
LST-391 was laid down 14 July 1942 at the Newport News Shipbuilding and Drydock Company of Newport News, Virginia, launched 28 October 1942, sponsored by Miss Katherine Wendell Blewett, and commissioned 3 December 1942.

During World War II, LST-391 was assigned to the European Theater and participated in the Sicilian occupation (July 1943), Salerno landings (September 1943), and the Invasion of Normandy (June 1944).

LST-391 earned three battle stars for World War II service.

Renamed USS Bowman County (LST-391) on 1 July 1955 for Bowman County, North Dakota, she was the only U.S. Naval vessel to bear the name.  She was transferred to Greece in May 1960 for service in the Royal Hellenic Navy and renamed Rodos (L157) where she remained in service until 1997.
 
Image of this LST at 13:47 in the video at http://burnpit.legion.org/2015/02/my-story-about-thule-operation-blue-jay

References

 
 
 LST-391 seen at 13:25 in the video at  http://burnpit.legion.org/2015/02/my-story-about-thule-operation-blue-jay

LST-1-class tank landing ships of the United States Navy
Ships built in Newport News, Virginia
1942 ships
World War II amphibious warfare vessels of the United States
Bowman County, North Dakota